Exonuclease 5 is a protein that in humans is encoded by the EXO5 gene.

Function

The protein encoded by this gene is a single-stranded DNA (ssDNA)-specific exonuclease that can slide along the DNA before cutting it. However, human replication protein A binds ssDNA and restricts sliding of the encoded protein, providing a 5'-directionality to the enzyme. This protein localizes to nuclear repair loci after DNA damage. [provided by RefSeq, Nov 2016].

References

Further reading